Hsing Hui (born Lai Ching-yin on 10 December 1975) is a Taiwanese actress. She is known for her roles in the television series Fiery Thunderbolt, Taiwan Tornado, Golden Ferris Wheel, My Family My Love, Lee Family Reunion, The Heart of Woman and Ordinary Love .

In 2004, she and her two brothers co-founded the bridal boutique, True Love Wedding.

Filmography

Television series

Variety show

References

1975 births
Living people
Taiwanese television actresses
20th-century Taiwanese actresses
21st-century Taiwanese actresses
Actresses from Tainan
Chungyu University of Film and Arts alumni